Aabybro or Åbybro  is a town in North Jutland, Denmark. The town is the seat of Jammerbugt Municipality, and is the biggest town in the municipality. Aabybro is located 17 km southwest of Brønderslev, 16 km northwest of Aalborg and 30 km northeast of Fjerritslev.

History
Aabybro was a railway town from 1897 until 1969. Before the construction of the station, there was a very small settlement in the area. The station brought more traffic and expanded the town. It was a stop on the Hjørring-Løkken-Aabybro rail, which operated between 1913 and 1963.

Aabybro was formerly the seat of Aabybro Municipality. The municipality was established in 1970 and lasted until 2007, where the municipality was merged with the municipalities of Pandrup, Brovst and Fjerritslev to form Jammerbugt Municipality.

Notable residents 
 Lone Drøscher Nielsen (born 1964), wildlife conservationist
 Kasper Pedersen (born 1993), football player

References

Municipal seats of the North Jutland Region
Municipal seats of Denmark
Cities and towns in the North Jutland Region
Jammerbugt Municipality